The Mauritius national under-17 football team is the national under-17 football team of Mauritius, controlled by the Mauritius Football Association. The Mauritius national under-17 football team is composed of the 20 best national football players, aged 17 years or less, selected from the 4 CTR's (Centre Technique Regional) spread throughout Mauritius. The main tournaments the team competes in are the COSAFA U-17 Challenge Cup, the Africa U-17 Cup of Nations, and the CJSOI games. The team has never qualified for the FIFA U-17 World Cup or the Africa U-17 Cup of Nations, but has won the CJSOI football gold medal twice, in 2008 and in 2010. The players in the team are being prepared to join the Mauritius national under-20 football team and the 1st Division Junior National Tournament in the coming years, as well as the Mauritius national football team soon after that.

Successful Players
The Under-17 Football Team produced a crop of successful players in the past who also played for the Mauritius national under-20 football team and the Mauritius national football team. Some of these players are Louis Fabrice Pithia, Andy Sophie, Henri Speville, Kersley Appou, Christopher Perle and Ricardo Naboth.

Awards and competition records

Mauritius U-17 football achievements
CJSOI Games :
2 Time Champion (2008) (2010)

FIFA U-17 World Cup
 1985 - Did not enter
 1987 - Withdrew
 1989 - Did not qualify
 1991 - Did not enter
 1993 - Did not qualify
 1995 - Did not qualify
 1997 - Did not enter
 1999 - Did not enter
 2001 - Did not qualify
 2003 - Did not qualify
 2005 - Withdrew
 2007 - Did not qualify
 2009 - Did not enter
 2011 - Withdrew
 2013 - Did not enter
 2015 - Did not enter
 2017 - Did not qualify

CAF U-16 and U-17 World Cup Qualifiers
 1985 - Did not enter
 1987 - Withdrew
 1989 - Did not qualify
 1991 - Did not enter
 1993 - Did not qualify

African Under-17 Championship
 1995 - Did not qualify
 1997 - Did not enter
 1999 - Did not enter
 2001 - Did not qualify
 2003 - Did not qualify
 2005 - Withdrew
 2007 - Did not qualify
 2009 - Did not enter
 2011 - Withdrew
 2013 - Did not enter
 2015 - Did not enter
 2017 - Did not qualify

COSAFA U-17 Challenge Cup
1994 to 2002 - Did not enter / Did not qualify
2009 - Cancelled
2016 - Group Stage
2017 - Runners-Up

Players

Current squad
The following players were named to the Mauritius U-17 squad for the CJSOI games.

|-----
! colspan="9" bgcolor="#B0D3FB" align="left" |
|----- bgcolor="#DFEDFD"
|-

|-----
! colspan="9" bgcolor="#B0D3FB" align="left" |
|----- bgcolor="#DFEDFD"
|-

|-----
! colspan="9" bgcolor="#B0D3FB" align="left" |
|----- bgcolor="#DFEDFD"
|-

Recent callups

See also
Mauritius national under-20 football team
Mauritius national football team

References

External links
 Mauritius national under-17 football team official page

African national under-17 association football teams
U